Navarch is an Anglicisation of a Greek word meaning "leader of the ships", which in some states became the title of an office equivalent to that of a modern admiral.

Historical usage 

Not all states gave their naval commanders such a title. Athens, for instance, placed its fleet under the command of generals (strategoi) holding the same title as those who commanded its land forces. Such command structures reflected the fact that, especially early in the Classical period, fleets operated in close conjunction with land forces, and indeed, the title of navarch did not begin to appear until the time of the Peloponnesian War, when fleets began to operate more independently. This separate title was originally used in cities that lacked an established naval tradition, Sparta being the most prominent, but entered broader use later, being adopted by the navies of the Hellenistic period states such as Macedon, Syracuse, the Ptolemaic Kingdom, the Seleucid Empire, the Achaean League, and Rhodes.

At Sparta and many other city-states, the position was held for one year only (a situation that compelled the Spartans to resort to an elaborate legal fiction when they wished to reinstate Lysander for more than one year in command). Admirals of despotic or monarchic states, however, could serve for years at a time. At Sparta, the position, unlike most high-level offices, was available to men from outside the Spartiate class; Lysander, the most famous occupant of the office, was a beneficiary of this rule.

The Latinisation  was used by the Roman navy for its squadron commanders.

Modern Greece 

In the modern Hellenic Navy,  is the highest rank, equivalent to full admiral. The same ranks are also used by the Hellenic Coast Guard. 

The rank of full admiral is held in active service only by the Chief of the General Staff of National Defence, when he is a naval officer, and customarily given to the Chiefs of the Hellenic Navy General Staff, who normally carry the rank of vice admiral, on retirement. 

It was held ex officio by the reigning monarch, who also held the equivalent ranks in the army and air force. Only kings George II, Paul and Constantine II held the rank.

See also

References 
Hornblower, Simon, and Anthony Spawforth ed., The Oxford Classical Dictionary (Oxford University Press, 2003) 

Hellenic Navy
Military ranks of ancient Greece
Military ranks of Greece
Military ranks of ancient Macedon
Naval ranks